The Tassajara Formation is a geologic unit within the Livermore Valley of Northern California, United States. The Tassajara Formation consists of sediments ranging from brown to gray mudstone, andesitic sandstone, conglomerate, and minor bentonitic and pumiceous tuff. In the northern San Ramon area, the Tassajara Formation underlies Quaternary valley fill material.

The Bishop Subbasin is an aquifer that resides between two subsurface ridge formations of the Tassajara Formation in the northern extremity of the Amador Valley.

See also
Arroyo de la Laguna
Arroyo Valle
Arroyo Mocho
Mocho Subbasin
South San Ramon Creek

References

Geologic formations of California
Geology of Alameda County, California
Neogene California
Sandstone formations of the United States
Tuff formations
Diablo Range
Livermore Valley